Caprio is an Italian surname. Notable people with the surname include:

Anthony S. Caprio, American scholar
David Caprio (born 1967), American attorney
Frank Caprio (born 1936), American judge
Frank T. Caprio (born 1966), American politician
Giuseppe Caprio (1914–2005), Italian cardinal
Hardy Caprio (born 1996), Sierra Leonean rapper, singer, songwriter, and record producer
John-Michael Caprio (1947–1997), American conductor and organist
Mino Caprio (born 1955), Italian actor and voice actor

See also
Caprio (company), drink and beverage company based in Poland
Leonardo DiCaprio (born 1974), American actor

Italian-language surnames